Dietrich Hecke (born 13 February 1935) is a German fencer. He represented the United Team of Germany at the 1964 Summer Olympics in the individual épée event.

References

1935 births
Living people
German male fencers
Olympic fencers of the United Team of Germany
Fencers at the 1964 Summer Olympics
Sportspeople from Aachen